Tropidia fasciata is a species of Hoverfly in the family Syrphidae.

Distribution
Germany.

References

Eristalinae
Diptera of Europe
Taxa named by Johann Wilhelm Meigen
Insects described in 1822